"Hello" is a song recorded by Japanese singer Aya Ueto, from her debut studio album, Ayaueto. It was released as the album's third and final single by Flight Master on February 26, 2003. The single was released in two versions, a standard edition and a limited edition, each with differing cover art. The first pressing of the limited edition also featured different artwork. The limited edition included a bonus DVD featuring the music video for "Hello". The "Symphony Modulation Style" remix of the song was used in commercials for Lotte ice cream Soh, starring Ueto herself.

Background
"Hello" was written, composed, arranged and produced by T2ya, marking his third consecutive collaboration with Ueto. CDJournal described the song as a "lyrical and melancholy ballad". "Hello" is composed in the key of A-flat major and set to a tempo of 84 beats per minute. Ueto's vocals span from B3 to C5. Initially, "Ambition", the leading track on Ayaueto, was set to be released as the third single off the album. However, Ueto insisted on "Hello" instead. "Hello" was recorded after Ueto had wrapped filming for Azumi, and right before Ueto started filming the drama series Kōkō Kyōshi (2003).

Chart performance
"Hello" entered the daily Oricon Singles Chart at number 6. It climbed to number 5 the next day, where it peaked. The single debuted at number 10 on the weekly chart, selling 23,000 copies in the first week. The limited edition of the single debuted at number 12 on the SoundScan singles chart. "Hello" charted on the Oricon Singles Chart for nine weeks, selling a reported total of 41,000 copies during its run.

Track listing

Charts

Sales

Release history

References

2003 songs
2003 singles
Aya Ueto songs
Song recordings produced by T2ya
Songs written by T2ya